This is a list of mayors of Subotica since 1796.

The Mayor of Subotica is the head of the City of Subotica (the fifth largest city in Serbia and second largest city in the Autonomous Province of Vojvodina). He acts on behalf of the city, and performs an executive function in the City of Subotica. The current Mayor of Subotica is Stevan Bakić (SNS).

Habsburg monarchy / Austrian Empire / Austria-Hungary
 Janoš Sučić (János Szucsics) (1796 – 1798) 
 Antal Milodanović (Antal Milodánovics) (1798 – 1800)
 Janoš Sučić (János Szucsics) (1800 – 1802) 
 Jakov Sarić (1802 – 1804)
 Đerđ Kopunović (György Kopunovics) (1804 – 1809) 
 Ferenc Czorda (1809 – 1813) 
 Antal Milodanović (Antal Milodánovics) (1813 – 1816) 
 Toma Kulunčić (1816 – 1820)
 Ferenc Czorda (1820 – 1828)
 Šimun Mukić (1828 – 1834)
 Jožef Sarić (József Szárics) (1834 – 1847)
 Ištvan Kulunčić (István Kuluncsics) (1847)
 Đerđ Vilov (György Vilov) (1847 – 1848)
 Ištvan Kulunčić (István Kuluncsics) (1848 – 1849)
 Frigyes Arnold (1849)
 Jovan Dimitrijević (1849)
 Pal Antunović (Pál Antunovics) (1849 – 1858)
 Endre Flatt (1858 – 1861)
 Janoš Mukić (János Mukics) (1861 – 1862)
 Endre Flatt (1862 – 1867)
 Máté Lénárd (1867 – 1872)
 Janoš Mukić (János Mukics) (1872 – 1884)
 Mihalj Pertić (Mihály Pertics) (1884)
 Lazar Mamužić (1884 – 1902)
 Károly Bíró (1902 – 1918)

Kingdom of Serbs, Croats and Slovenes / Kingdom of Yugoslavia
 Lukač Plesković (1918)
 Stipan Matijević (1918 – 1920)
 Vranje Sudarević (1920)
 Andrija Pletikosić (1920 – 1922)
 Nikola Tabaković (1922)
 Mirko Ivković Ivandekić (1923)
 Albe Malagurski (1924 – 1926)
 Dragoslav Đorđević (1926)
 Dragutin Stipić (1927 – 1929)
 Selimir Ostojić (1929 – 1931)
 Frano Vukić (1931 – 1933)
 Ivan Ivković Ivandekić (1933 – 1938)
 Marko Jurić (1938 – 1939)
 Ladislav Lipozenčić (1939 – 1941)

Hungarian occupation
 Dezső Bitó, János Völgyi (1941 – 1943)
 Jenő Székely (1943 – 1944)

DF Yugoslavia / FPR Yugoslavia / SFR Yugoslavia
 Lajčo Jaramazović (1944 – 1945)
 Milan Milanković (1945 – 1947)
 Alojzije Mihaljčević, Géza Tikvicki (1947 – 1948)
 Alojzije Mihaljčević, Marko Bačlija (1948 – 1952)
 Marko Horvacki (1952 – 1953)
 Vinko Lendvai (1953 – 1954)
 Miklós Kalmár (1954 – 1955)
 István Budai (1955 – 1960)
 Ivan Vuković (1960 – 1963)
 Marko Poljaković (1963 – 1965)
 Marko Poljaković, Matija Sedlak (1965 – 1968)
 Károly Bagi (1968 – 1974)
 József Dékány (1974 – 1978)
 Béla Vass (1978 – 1982)
 Stjepan Milašin (1982 – 1983)
 Janko Pejanović (1983 – 1984)
 György Szórád (1984 – 1985)
 József Palencsár (1985 – 1989)
 József Kasza (1989 – 1992)

FR Yugoslavia / Serbia and Montenegro

Republic of Serbia

See also
 Subotica

External links
 Za 212 godina 59 gradonačelnika prošlo kroz gradsku kuću

Subotica
List